Best of Jeff Foxworthy: Double Wide, Single Minded is a compilation album by American comedian Jeff Foxworthy. It was released by Rhino Entertainment on March 5, 2004. The album peaked at number 76 on the Billboard 200 chart.

Track listing
All tracks written by Jeff Foxworthy except where noted.
"You Might Be a Redneck If…" – 2:41
"Seek and Destroy" – 3:59
"Sophisticated People vs. Rednecks" (Foxworthy, Ritch Shydner) – 6:17
"You Can't Give Rednecks Money" (Foxworthy, Shydner) – 1:51
"Still More You Might Be a Redneck If…" – 2:57
"Southern Accent" – 2:28
"Big O' Moon" (Foxworthy, Dr. Jim Rouse, Scott Rouse) – 2:25
"Victoria's Secret" – 4:12
"S.I.N.G.L.E." – 4:02
"Life as a Father" – 9:43
"I Still Don't Know…" – 10:24
"The Rules of Marriage" (Foxworthy, Shydner) – 10:40
"Every Single Hair on Her Body" (Foxworthy, Shydner) – 5:56
"Made a Friend in the Bathroom" – 0:48
"You Might Be a Redneck If…, Pt. 6" – 6:02
"Pure Bred Redneck" (Glenn Ashworth, Buddy Causey, Foxworthy, Dana Sigmon) – 3:04
with Cooter Brown

Charts

Weekly charts

Year-end charts

References

2003 greatest hits albums
Jeff Foxworthy albums
Rhino Entertainment compilation albums
2000s comedy albums